Leeuwenhoekiella marinoflava  is a bacterium from the genus of Leeuwenhoekiella which has been isolated from seawater from Scotland.

References

External links
Type strain of Leeuwenhoekiella marinoflava at BacDive -  the Bacterial Diversity Metadatabase

Flavobacteria
Bacteria described in 1989
Leeuwenhoekiella